Marek Aleksander Czarnecki (born 22 March 1959 in Chorzów) is a Polish politician and was from 2004 to 2009 a Member of the European Parliament (MEP) for the Masovian Voivodship with the Self-Defense, and was therefore a Non-Inscrit in the European Parliament.

Czarnecki sat on the Committee on Legal Affairs, and was a substitute for the Committee on Civil Liberties, Justice and Home Affairs and a member of the Delegation for relations with Israel. Chairman of the Group on South Asia - "South Asia Peace Forum" in the European Parliament.

Education
 Master of Law from the Faculty of Law and Administration at the University of Warsaw (1986)
 1983: graduate of the department of Journalism and Political Studies at the University of Warsaw

Career
 1989-1993: Articled to the bench (1986-1988), articled barrister
 1997-1998: Voivode of the sub-region of Bialskopodlaski
 1999-2000: Chairman RUCH S.A
 2001: Vice-Chairman of the Military Property Agency
 Barrister with 'Czarnecki & Bagińska, Barristers and Legal Advisers' sp.k

See also
 2004 European Parliament election in Poland

External links
 
 
 

1959 births
Living people
People from Chorzów
Democratic Party – demokraci.pl politicians
Self-Defence of the Republic of Poland MEPs
MEPs for Poland 2004–2009